Bronisław Karwecki (13 May 1912 – 11 November 1998) was a Polish rower. He competed in the men's coxed four at the 1936 Summer Olympics.

References

1912 births
1998 deaths
Polish male rowers
Olympic rowers of Poland
Rowers at the 1936 Summer Olympics
Sportspeople from Grodno